The 1999–2000 Danish 1st Division season was the 55th season of the Danish 1st Division league championship and the 14th consecutive as a second tier competition governed by the Danish Football Association.

The division-champion and runner-up promoted to the 2000–01 Danish Superliga. The teams in the 13th to 16th spots relegated to the 2000–01 Danish 2nd Division.

Table

Top goalscorers

See also
 1999–2000 in Danish football
 1999–2000 Danish Superliga

External links
 Peders Fodboldstatistik

Danish 1st Division seasons
Denmark
2